Punjabis are the majority ethnic group in Pakistan. They celebrate a number of religious and cultural festivals:

List and description of Islamic festivals
Religious festivals are determined by the Islamic calendar.

List and description of festivals observed at shrines
The festivals held at shrines are determined by the Islamic calendar and the Punjabi calendar.

List and description of cultural festivals
Cultural festivals are determined by the Gregorian calendar or the Punjabi calendar.

See also
 Punjabi festivals
 Punjabi culture
 Punjabi Culture Day
 Punjabi calendar
 Festivals in Lahore
 Festivals in Multan
 Vaisakhi
 Sikh festivals

References

 
Festivals in Punjab, Pakistan
Culture of Punjab, Pakistan
Punjabi culture
Punjab, Pakistan